The 1464 papal conclave (August 28–30), convened after the death of Pope Pius II, elected as his successor cardinal Pietro Barbo, who took the name Paul II.

List of participants

Pope Pius II died on August 14, 1464, in Ancona during preparations for the crusade against the Ottoman Empire. At the time of his death, there were 29 living cardinals, but only 19 of them participated in the conclave:

Ten electors were Italian, four Spaniards, four French and one Greek. Six were created by Pius II, six by Eugenius IV, four by Callixtus III and three by Nicholas V.

Absentees

Ten cardinals (over 1/3 of the whole Sacred College) did not participate in this conclave:

Of the absentee cardinals five were created by Pius II, two by Eugenius IV, one by Callixtus III and one by Nicholas V. Pierre de Foix was the last surviving cardinal of the Great Western Schism and was elevated by Pisan Antipope John XXIII.

Among them there were three French, two Italians, two Germans, two Spaniards and the one Hungarian.

Candidates to the papacy 

Bessarion, d'Estouteville, Trevisan, Carvajal, Torquemada and Barbo were mentioned as main papabili in the contemporary reports of the ambassadors and envoys of Italian Princes. Also Calandrini, Roverella and Capranica were referred to as possible candidates.

The election of Pope Paul II

On the evening of August 28 all cardinals present in Rome entered the conclave in the Vatican, with the exception of ill Cardinal Torquemada, who joined the rest on the following day.

Initially, in order to secure to the cardinals a greater share of power than they had enjoyed under Pius II, a capitulation was prepared the conclave capitulation, and all except Ludovico Trevisan subscribed to it. The terms of the capitulation were the following:

continue the Crusades against the Ottoman Empire
leave Rome only with the consent of the majority of cardinals; the Italian Peninsula with the consent of all
college of Cardinals limited to 24
new pope limited to one cardinal-nephew
creation of cardinals or advancement of benefices required the consent of the College.

The first scrutiny took place on August 30. Cardinal Pietro Barbo received eleven votes, while the remaining fell to Trevisan and d'Estouteville. On the following accessus Barbo received three additional votes and was elected Pope. He took the name Paul II, and a little bit later protodeacon Rodrigo Borgia announced the election to the people of Rome with the ancient formula Habemus Papam. On September 6 the new pope was solemnly crowned on the steps of the patriarchal Vatican Basilica by Cardinal Niccolò Fortiguerra, priest of the title of S. Cecilia.

Notes

Sources 

 Ludwig von Pastor: "History of the popes vol. 4", London 1900
 

1464 in Europe
1464
15th-century elections
15th-century Catholicism
15th century in the Papal States
Pope Paul II